Lennart Ekdahl (8 December 1912 – 15 September 2005) was a Swedish sailor who competed in the 1936 Summer Olympics.

In 1936 he was a crew member of the Swedish boat May Be which won the bronze medal in the 6 metre class.

External links
profile

1912 births
2005 deaths
Swedish male sailors (sport)
Olympic sailors of Sweden
Sailors at the 1936 Summer Olympics – 6 Metre
Olympic bronze medalists for Sweden
Olympic medalists in sailing

Medalists at the 1936 Summer Olympics
20th-century Swedish people
21st-century Swedish people